Ralph Charles (born 5 February 1943) is an English amateur welterweight and professional light welter/welter/light middle/middleweight boxer of the 1960s and '70s who as an amateur won the Amateur Boxing Association of England (ABAE) 1959 Junior Class-A title against Kenneth "Ken"/"Kenny" J. Cooper  (Warley ABC), boxing out of West Ham Boys & ABC, won the Amateur Boxing Association of England (ABAE) 1960 Junior Class-B title against J. Harwood (National Association of Boys Clubs), boxing out of West Ham Boys & ABC, and was runner-up for the 1963 Amateur Boxing Association of England welterweight title, against Johnny Pritchett (Bingham & District ABC), boxing out of West Ham ABC, and as a professional won the British Boxing Board of Control (BBBofC) Southern Area welterweight title, BBBofC British welterweight title, European Boxing Union (EBU) welterweight title, and Commonwealth welterweight title, and was a challenger for the World Boxing Council (WBC) welterweight title, and World Boxing Association (WBA) World welterweight title against José Nápoles, his professional fighting weight varied from , i.e. light welterweight to , i.e. middleweight.

References

External links

Image - Ralph Charles

1943 births
English male boxers
Middleweight boxers
Light-middleweight boxers
Light-welterweight boxers
Living people
Place of birth missing (living people)
Boxers from Greater London
Welterweight boxers